HMS Sphinx (J69) was a  (officially, "fleet minesweeping sloop") of the British Royal Navy, which was commissioned in 1939, just prior to World War II. During the war she served in the North Sea until bombed and wrecked on 2 February 1940.

Service history
The ship was built by William Hamilton and Company, Port Glasgow, with turbine engines supplied by J. Samuel White of Cowes. She was laid down on 17 January 1938, and launched on 7 February 1939.

Sphinx was commissioned in July 1939, and assigned to the 5th Minesweeping Flotilla, based at Dover as part of the Nore Command. The flotilla carried out minesweeping in the English Channel and the North Sea until December, when it was transferred to Rosyth.

Sinking
On the morning of 2 February 1940 the Flotilla was minesweeping in the Moray Firth, 15 miles north of Kinnaird Head, in position , when it came under attack by German aircraft. Sphinx was hit by a bomb, which penetrated the foredeck and exploded, killing five men, including the commanding officer Cdr. John Robert Newton Taylor. The wreck later drifted ashore two miles north of Lybster, and was eventually sold for scrap.

On 7 June 1940 the OBE was awarded to Sphinxs Senior surviving Officer and two members of the crew, and there were five Mentions in Despatches, three to crewmen of Sphinx and two from Boreas.

References

External links
 
 
 
 
 

1939 ships
Ships built on the River Clyde
Halcyon-class minesweepers
World War II minesweepers of the United Kingdom
Maritime incidents in February 1940
Ships sunk by German aircraft
Minesweepers sunk by aircraft